The PARS 3 LR in German service, also known as TRIGAT-LR (Third Generation AntiTank, Long Range) and AC 3G in French, is a fire-and-forget missile, which can be used against air or ground targets. It is intended for long range applications and designed to defeat tanks, helicopters and other individual targets, while minimizing the exposure of the launch vehicle to enemy fire. It is to be the main weapon system of the Eurocopter Tiger UHT helicopter. PARS 3 LR will be able to be fired in salvos of up to four in eight seconds. The missile can be applied in direct attack or top-attack modes.

Development

The programme was initiated by Germany, France and the United Kingdom. After the UK withdrew, only Germany and France remained. The manufacturer is Parsys GmbH, a joint venture between MBDA Deutschland GmbH and Diehl BGT Defence.

A lighter, medium-range and man-portable version called Trigat-MR (MR for Medium Range) was also planned; it was later cancelled. The project evolved into the proposed Trigan system, which is based on the MILAN 3 firing posts and the Trigat-MR missile.

France withdrew from the programme in 2004. On 30 June 2006, Germany ordered 680 PARS 3 LR missiles for 380 million. Deliveries began in 2012. Indonesia ordered also 700 PARS 3 LR Missiles for 420 million. Deliveries began in 2018.

See also
 AGM-114 Hellfire
 AT-6 Spiral
 Barq
 AT-9
 Brimstone missile
 Euromissile HOT
 List of missiles
 Nag missile
 Spike-ER
 UMTAS

References

External links
 PARS 3 LR at MBDA Germany
 PARS 3 LR at Diehl BGT
 PARS 3 / TRIGAT Anti-Tank Missile at army-technology
 TDW GmbH

Air-to-surface missiles
Anti-tank guided missiles
Anti-tank guided missiles of Germany
Post–Cold War weapons of Germany
Military equipment introduced in the 2010s
Fire-and-forget weapons